Ammonitella is a genus of small, air-breathing land snails, terrestrial pulmonate gastropod molluscs in the family Megomphicidae.

Species
Species within the genus Ammonitella include:
 Ammonitella yatesii

References

 
Megomphicidae
Taxonomy articles created by Polbot